Virginia Lee Montgomery (born 1986) is an American visual artist working in video art, performance art, sound art, and sculpture. She has exhibited extensively throughout the U.S. and Europe.

Early life and education 

Montgomery was raised in Houston, Texas and attended the University of Texas at Austin (2008) for her undergraduate BFA studies and attended Yale University for her graduate MFA studies.

Work 
Montgomery is a feminist artist. Her artwork is known for its surrealist qualities. Symbolic imagery like circles, holes, and spheres recur in her artwork—facilitating unexpected insights about gender and visual language. She states in an interview with She/Folk magazine, "[Through my art] I can survey relationships between bodies, hierarchies between objects, genders, sound or forms, and thus allow forth a message to emerge from these intersecting realms of cognitive awareness and sensorial participation. 
 In the exhibition catalog for Crash Test, Curator Nicolas Bourriaud writes, "...Virginia Lee Montgomery's works display images atomized by technology: their aim is no longer to represent the world, but to find the points through which it manifests itself and operates, the source from which it draws its morphological power, in other words its capacity to generate forms and to produce effects." She has exhibited at art institutions including New Museum, Socrates Sculpture Park, Center for Curatorial Studies, Bard College, Times Square Arts, SculptureCenter, Museum Folkwang, and Lawndale Art Center. She has exhibited at galleries including Hesse Flatow Gallery, False Flag Gallery, and Meyohas Gallery. 
Her public monument to Yale University's particle accelerator, PORTAL, was commissioned by Yale University and is on permanent display at Wright Lab Arts in New Haven, Connecticut.

Video

Sky Loop (2020) 
The Sky Loop exhibition is a video art installation exploring the artist's firsthand experience of Hurricane Harvey from a psychoanalytic perspective. The installation interweaves video imagery of hurricanes and butterflies as inspired by the Butterfly Effect theory. The exhibition was commissioned by the Lawndale Art Center of Houston, Texas. Montgomery was interviewed by NPR correspondent Catherine Lu about the Sky Loop video exhibition on KUHT Houston Public Media, 88.7FM radio.

Pony Cocoon (2019) 
Pony Cocoon is a video artwork depicting a luna moth hatching from a blonde ponytail hair prop. The film conceptually interweaves themes of psychology and entomology. The Pony Cocoon video is recorded in high definition macro camera footage. The film's soundscape is original and constructed from field recordings by the artist. Pony Cocoon was exhibited at False Flag Gallery in 2019.

Honey Moon (2019) 
Honey Moon is a public video artwork that was created for Times Square Arts in New York City. The video depicts the artist's hand holding a small model moon as honey streams over it. The artwork screened in Times Square across many large advertising screens nightly at 11:59PM during the month of February in 2019. Honey Moon was a part of the public arts programming for Midnight Moment. While in interview with Times Square Arts, artist Montgomery said of the Honey Moon project, "We live in an age that often feels more unreal than real, in which things seem to move faster than we can perceive them. As an artist, I wanted to do something different; I wanted to create a sculptural film that felt material, soothing, and real." Midnight Moment is the world's largest, longest-running digital art exhibition, synchronized on electronic billboards throughout Times Square with an estimated annual viewership of 2.5 million.

Cut Copy Sphinx (2018) 
Cut Copy Sphinx is a video artwork inspired by the Me Too Movement. The Cut Copy Sphinx video is a companion piece to the artist's public New York City sculpture, SWORD IN THE SPHINX, that was commissioned by Socrates Sculpture Park for the 2018 Socrates Annual exhibition. The video has been exhibited at the New Museum, New Orleans Film Festival (2019), and the Ann Arbor Film Festival (2019).

Pony Hotel (2018) 
The Pony Hotel artwork documents the artist's ponytail prop inside various hotel rooms during her career traveling for Graphic Facilitator work. The video shows the artist as she animates her ponytail like a puppet inside the hotel rooms. The Pony Hotel artwork was part of a video art exhibition series shown at New York City's New Museum in 2019. Curatorial Assistant Kate Weiner wrote that the artworks, including Pony Hotel, "interrogate the relationship between physical and psychic structures." The PONY HOTEL video was presented as a video installation and solo exhibition at Museum Folkwang in Essen, Germany in 2019.

Water Witching (2018) 
The Water Witching video artwork contains archival footages from nature, divination practices, and feminist protest from the 2017 Women's March in Washington D.C., Water Witching thematically explores agency amidst ecological, spiritual, or political adversity.  The film's soundscape is composed of field recordings of water, wind, machines, animals, and human protest. Water Witching was commissioned by New York's Center for Curatorial Studies at Bard College for the exhibition, "An unbound knot in the wind" curated by Alison Karasyk.

Sculpture

Marble Ponytails (2019) 
The Marble Ponytail sculptures are hand-carved in Vermont marble. The sculptures were created at the historic West Rutland, Vermont marble quarry on an arts fellowship through The Vermont Carving Studio and Sculpture Center in 2018.

Sword in the Sphinx (2018) 
The Sword in the Sphinx sculpture features a resin-cast copy of a historical French garden sphinx in the likeness of the 18th century court mistress, Madame de Pompadour, impaled by a steel sword. Writer Wendy Vogel for Art in America magazine noted that the sculpture overturns the masculine bravado of the tales of King Arthur and Oedipus. The sculpture was commissioned by Socrates Sculpture Park of New York City for the 2018 Socrates Annual exhibition.

Particle Accelerator Memorial Project: Ideation Accelerator (2015-2017) 

The Particle Accelerator Memorial Project, commissioned by Wright Laboratory at Yale University, is an art project by Montgomery at the Yale University physics department. The artwork is about the decommission of Wright Lab's linear particle accelerator. Montgomery created a large free-standing public sculpture outside the Yale Physics Department's building entitled, Portal (2017). The sculpture is a 9-ton, 14 ft blue monument engineered from the original entrance portal of the linear particle accelerator. Portal is Montgomery's first outdoor monument. It is on permanent display at Yale University in New Haven, Connecticut.

Split Sword (2017) 
The Split Sword sculpture is a handmade steel sword. Its shape is inspired by the medieval divination tool known as the Y-rod that was traditionally employed as an alternative means for discovering natural resources such as water, oil, or gold. This process is known as dowsing. The Split Sword artwork has previously been exhibited at Center for Curatorial Studies, Bard College, NY and Ramapo College, NJ.

Head Stone (2016) 
The Head Stone sculpture is made blue memory foam and a  stone. The Head Stone sculpture has exhibited at the Center for Curatorial Studies at, and the Lawndale Art Center.

Selected exhibitions 
 (2016) Things You Can't Unthink, Walter Phillips Gallery, Banff Centre for Arts and Creativity, Canada
 (2016) Onsite Offsite Parasite, Greene Gallery, Yale School of Art, New Haven, CT
 (2016) SOS Onshore Offshore, Meyohas Gallery, New York, NY
 (2017) Material Deviance, Sculpture Center, Long Island City, New York
 (2015-2017) Particle Accelerator Memorial Project: Wright Nuclear Structure Laboratory, Yale Department of Physics, New Haven, CT
 (2018) Open Mind, Crush Curatorial, New York, NY
 (2018) An Unbound Knot in the Wind, Center for Curatorial Studies, Bard College, Hudson, NY
 (2018 - 2019) Sword in the Sphinx, Socrates Sculpture Park, New York, NY
 (2019) The Pony Hotel, Museum Folkwang, Essen, Germany
 (2019) Pony Cocoon, False Flag, Long Island City, NY
 (2019) Honey Moon, Times Square Arts, New York, NY
 (2020) Sky Loop, Lawndale Art Center, Houston, TX

References 

Yale University alumni
1986 births
Living people
University of Texas at Austin alumni
21st-century American women artists
Artists from Houston
American video artists
American women sculptors
21st-century American sculptors
American sound artists
Women sound artists
American performance artists
Sculptors from Texas
Feminist artists
American feminists